The Southern Jutland Artillery Regiment was an artillery regiment of the Royal Danish Army.  
The regiment was established on November 1, 1951 as 4 Field Artillery Regiment in Aarhus. The regiment is based on the 7th Artillery Battalion   of 3 Field Artillery Regiment, and the regiment can thus trace its history back to 1842.

On 23 October 1953 The regiment was transferred to the new build barracks in Varde

Between 1953 and 2000 various units was transferred back and forward, between Nørrerjyske Artilleriregiment and Southern Jutland Artillery Regiment. Including 6th Artillery Battalion there first was in Varde from 1969 to 1974 and then again from 1987 to 1989.

On 20 February 1974, the Artillery NCO School in Ringsted and Artillery School on Amager was merged into the new Army Firesupport School and collocated with Southern Jutland Artillery Regiment in Varde.

On 1 November 2000 it was merged with Nørrerjyske Artilleriregiment to form Dronningens Artilleriregiment at the barracks in Varde.

Units
 
  7th Armoured Artillery Battalion, part of 3rd Jutland Brigade
  14th Anti Air Artillery Battalion (1990-2000) part of Jutland Division Artillery, Transferred from Nørrerjyske Artilleriregiment
  10th Light Artillery Battalion, part of Military region III
  11th Light Artillery Battalion, part of Military region IV
  24th Artillery Battalion  part of Jutland Division Artillery
  Staff and Target Acquisition Battery/JDIV(1982-2000) part of Jutland Division Artillery, Transferred from Nørrerjyske Artilleriregiment

Names of the regiment

References

 Lærebog for Hærens Menige, Hærkommandoen, marts 1960

Military units and formations established in 1923
Artillery regiments of Denmark
1923 establishments in Denmark